Sarona Moana Marie Reiher Snuka-Polamalu (born January 10, 1978) is an American professional wrestler. She is currently signed to WWE, where she performs on the Raw brand under the ring name Tamina. She is a one-time  WWE Women's Tag Team Champion and a nine-time WWE 24/7 Champion. She is a second generation professional wrestler, the daughter of Jimmy Snuka.

Professional wrestling career

Early career (2009–2010) 
Snuka first became involved in professional wrestling after she received the first Lia Maivia Scholarship to train at the Wild Samoan Training Center in Minneola, Florida.

World Wrestling Entertainment/WWE

Various alliances (2010–2011) 

On the May 24, 2010, episode of Raw, Snuka debuted as a villainous character, under the ring name Tamina, along with Jimmy and Jey Uso by attacking the Unified Tag Team Champions, The Hart Dynasty (David Hart Smith, Tyson Kidd, and Natalya). The next week on the May 31 episode of Raw, Tamina and The Usos introduced themselves and stated that the Hart Dynasty were in the "wrong place at the wrong time", before again brawling with the trio. On June 20 at Fatal 4-Way, Tamina and the Usos were defeated by the Hart Dynasty in a six-person mixed tag team match, after Natalya pinned Tamina. Two weeks later on the June 21 episode of Raw, Tamina made her singles debut against Natalya, but the match ended in a no contest after The Nexus interrupted the match. On the June 28 episode of Raw, Tamina and The Usos were scheduled to face The Hart Dynasty in another six-person mixed tag team match, but instead attacked them during their entrance, leading to Tamina throwing Natalya in the ring and executing the Superfly Splash on her. On the July 12 episode of Raw, Tamina and The Usos won their first match by defeating The Hart Dynasty in a six-person mixed tag team match. At the Money in the Bank pay-per-view, Tamina accompanied The Usos to a tag team match against The Hart Dynasty, which the Usos lost. On the July 26 episode of Raw, Tamina, along with Jimmy Uso accompanied Jey Uso to a singles match against Randy Orton, but Jey was unsuccessful in defeating Orton.

On the August 9 episode of Raw, Tamina began flirting with Santino Marella, hinting a face turn. Two weeks later, Tamina accompanied The Usos in a tag team match against Marella and Vladimir Kozlov in a losing effort, but Tamina would then afterwards stop the Usos from attacking Marella, and blew a kiss to him as she left the ring. On the September 27 episode of Raw, Tamina competed in a Divas battle royal to determine the number one contender to the WWE Divas Championship, which was ultimately won by Natalya. On the October 11 episode of Raw, Tamina joined Santino Marella after his victory over Zack Ryder and celebrated with him. A few weeks later on the November 8 episode of Raw, Tamina teamed with Alicia Fox and Maryse in a "Diva Cup Match" in a losing effort to Eve Torres and The Bella Twins. On the November 15 episode of Raw, Tamina accompanied The Usos to a number one contender's tag team match against Santino Marella and Vladimir Kozlov in a losing effort. Tamina made a backstage appearance with Marella and Kozlov on the November 22 episode of Raw, when she serenaded and kissed Marella. Two weeks later on the November 29 episode of Raw, Tamina teamed with Alicia Fox and Maryse in a six-Diva tag team match against Natalya, Gail Kim and Melina, but was distracted by Marella serenading her, and she left the ring with him.

On the December 6 episode of Raw, Tamina began an on-screen relationship with Marella, beginning by accompanying him and his partner Vladimir Kozlov in a three-team elimination tag team match against the teams of The Nexus (Justin Gabriel and Heath Slater) and The Usos in a winning effort, as Tamina got into the ring and kissed Marella, officially becoming the valet of the team. On the December 20 episode of Raw, Tamina teamed with Marella in a mixed tag team match in a winning effort against Maryse and Ted DiBiase Jr. The next week on the December 27 episode of Raw, Snuka accompanied Marella to a win against Ted DiBiase. On the January 3 episode of Raw, Tamina accompanied Marella and Vladimir Kozlov in a tag team match against The Usos in a losing effort.

Divas Championship pursuits (2011–2013) 

After being drafted to the SmackDown brand as part of the 2011 supplemental draft, Tamina made her SmackDown debut as a villain on the May 27 episode of SmackDown, teaming with Alicia Fox to defeat the team of AJ and Kaitlyn, who were accompanied by their mentor Natalya. A week later on SmackDown, Tamina and Fox again defeated AJ and Kaitlyn, with Tamina pinning AJ. On the June 23 episode of Superstars, Tamina competed in a six-Diva tag team match with Alicia Fox and Rosa Mendes in a losing effort to AJ, Kaitlyn and Natalya. Tamina then began appearing on the fifth season of NXT, debuting on the October 26 episode in a loss to Kaitlyn. On the November 2 episode of NXT Redemption, Tamina would lose again in a rematch against Kaitlyn. Tamina would then begin an on-screen relationship with JTG, becoming his valet. She accompanied him on the November 9 episode of NXT Redemption in a losing effort against Jimmy Uso.

On the December 30 episode of SmackDown, Tamina teamed with Natalya in a losing effort to Kaitlyn and Alicia Fox, and would afterwards attack Natalya, turning face in the process, and beginning a feud between the two about their respective families. Over the next two weeks on SmackDown, Tamina would defeat Natalya in singles competition. On the February 10 episode of SmackDown, Tamina saved Alicia Fox from an attack by the WWE Divas Champion Beth Phoenix. Tamina and Beth would then have a stare down, which resulted in Snuka challenging Phoenix for her title. Tamina, now billed as Tamina Snuka, received her title shot on February 19 at the Elimination Chamber pay-per-view, but was defeated by Phoenix. On the April 25 episode of NXT Redemption, Snuka and Kaitlyn defeated the team of Maxine and Natalya. On the June 6 episode of NXT Redemption, Snuka defeated Natalya. At the Money In The Bank pay-per-view, Snuka teamed up with Kaitlyn and Layla, defeating the team of Beth Phoenix, Natalya and Eve Torres. Snuka appeared on the re-branded NXT three days later, where she defeated Kaitlyn. On the August 20 episode of Raw, Snuka competed in a number one contender's battle royal, but was unsuccessful in winning the match. Also during the match, Snuka suffered a legitimate back injury.

After three months of inactivity, Snuka returned from injury on November 18 at the Survivor Series pay-per-view as a heel, interrupting a segment between AJ Lee and Vickie Guerrero by attacking AJ from behind. Snuka made her in-ring return on the November 26 episode of Raw, defeating Alicia Fox. On the January 28, 2013 episode of Raw, Snuka faced Divas Champion Kaitlyn in a non-title lumberjill match, however, the match ended in a no-contest after the lumberjills interfered. On February 17 at Elimination Chamber, Snuka unsuccessfully challenged Kaitlyn for the Divas Championship. On the June 5 episode of NXT, Snuka was defeated by Paige in the first round of the NXT Women's Championship tournament to crown the inaugural champion.

AJ Lee's bodyguard (2013–2014) 

Snuka returned to WWE programming in late September 2013, taking on the role as Divas Champion AJ Lee's bodyguard. Snuka helped AJ retain her Divas Championship at Battleground by attacking challenger Nikki Bella. On the November 13 episode of Main Event, AJ retained her title against Natalya after Snuka interfered and attacked Natalya. This led to a match between Snuka and Natalya on the November 15 episode of SmackDown, which Snuka lost. AJ went on to captain a team at Survivor Series in a seven-on-seven elimination tag team match against the cast of Total Divas, where Snuka was the penultimate eliminated, courtesy of Natalya, and competed on a rematch the next night on the November 25 episode of Raw, where she eliminated The Funkadactyls (Cameron and Naomi) before being pinned and eliminated by JoJo.

On February 23, 2014, at the Elimination Chamber pay-per-view, Snuka accidentally superkicked AJ during her title match against Cameron, and eventually caused a disqualification when Cameron almost won the match. This signaled tension between the two, which was followed by their back-to-back losses in tag team competition, leading to Snuka shoving AJ to the ground. On April 6, Snuka made her WrestleMania debut, competing at WrestleMania XXX in the 14-Diva "Vickie Guerrero Invitational match" for the WWE Divas Championship, which was won by the defending champion AJ Lee. After AJ lost her Divas Championship to Paige the next night on Raw, and was subsequently granted time off from WWE, Snuka won a battle royal to become the number one contender to Paige's Divas Championship. Snuka faced Paige for the title at Extreme Rules on May 4, but failed to win.

Team B.A.D. (2015–2016) 

Eleven months after having undergone surgery following a torn ACL on June 4, 2014, Snuka, billed simply as Tamina again, returned on the May 4, 2015, episode of Raw, allying herself with Naomi, as the two attacked The Bella Twins. Tamina made her in-ring return on the May 11 episode of Raw in a winning effort against Brie Bella, with Naomi in her corner. Tamina and Naomi went on to defeat the Bella Twins in a tag team match at Payback. The following night on Raw, Tamina interfered in Naomi's Divas Championship match against Nikki Bella, causing a disqualification. After the match, Paige returned from injury and attacked Tamina, Naomi and Nikki. At The Beast in the East on July 4, Tamina failed to capture the Divas Championship from Nikki Bella in a triple threat match that also involved Paige.

On the July 13 episode of Raw, after weeks of being outnumbered by Team Bella (The Bella Twins and Alicia Fox), Stephanie McMahon called for a "revolution" in the Divas division and introduced the debuting NXT Women's Champion Sasha Banks as an ally to Tamina and Naomi. Charlotte and Becky Lynch would then debut and ally with Paige, leading to a brawl between the three teams. The trio of Tamina, Naomi and Banks was later dubbed Team B.A.D. (Beautiful and Dangerous). At Battleground, a triple threat match took place with Banks representing Team B.A.D., against Charlotte of PCB and Brie Bella for Team Bella in a losing effort, while Charlotte picked up victory. The three teams would ultimately face off at SummerSlam in a three team elimination match, where Team B.A.D. were the first team to be eliminated courtesy of Team Bella when Tamina was pinned by Brie, and PCB would win the match.

On the February 1, 2016, episode of Raw, Tamina and Naomi attacked Banks after the latter announced her departure from team B.A.D. The feud between Tamina and Naomi and Banks would continue throughout February, and would lead to a tag team match at Fastlane, where Tamina and Naomi lost to Banks and her partner Becky Lynch. In late March, Tamina and Naomi allied with Lana, Emma and Summer Rae, leading to a 10-Diva tag team match on the WrestleMania 32 pre-show, which Tamina's team lost. In early May, Tamina underwent knee surgery in order to repair torn ligaments, while Naomi also claimed to be injured on May 5, due to a torn ankle tendon, thus disbanding the team. After having been undrafted in the 2016 WWE draft due to her injury, it was reported in December that Tamina was cleared for in-ring competition.

Alliance with Lana (2017–2018) 
On February 18, 2017, Snuka made her in-ring return in a tag-team match at a SmackDown live event, where she and Natalya scored a victory over Alexa Bliss and Carmella. She made her televised return on the April 11 episode of SmackDown Live, where she was established as a member of the SmackDown brand as part of the "Superstar Shake Up". On the April 25 episode of SmackDown, Tamina interfered in a title match between Charlotte Flair and Naomi alongside Natalya and Carmella. On May 21 at Backlash, Tamina competed in a six-woman tag team match alongside Carmella and Natalya, where the three emerged victorious over Flair, Naomi, and Becky Lynch. On June 18 at Money in the Bank, Snuka competed in the inaugural women's Money in the Bank ladder match, which was won by Carmella following an interference by James Ellsworth. On the June 20 episode of SmackDown, Carmella was stripped from the briefcase by SmackDown's general manager, Daniel Bryan, and a rematch took place on the June 27 episode's main event, in which Tamina failed again and Carmella was victorious.

On the July 4 episode of Smackdown, Tamina comforted Lana after her championship loss, teasing an alliance between the two. Lana later became her manager. On July 23 at Battleground, Snuka unsuccessfully competed in a five-way elimination match to determine the number one contender for the SmackDown Women's Championship after she was eliminated by Becky Lynch. On the September 19 episode of SmackDown, Snuka participated in a fatal four-way match to determine the number one contender for Natalya's SmackDown Women's Championship against Becky Lynch, Naomi and the returning Charlotte Flair, which was won by Flair. On November 19 at Survivor Series, Tamina represented Team SmackDown in a ten-woman elimination tag team match against Team Raw, losing the match but scoring an elimination over Bayley. On January 28, 2018, at Royal Rumble, Tamina entered at number 7 during the first women's Royal Rumble match, in which she was eliminated by Lita. Shortly thereafter, Tamina would go on hiatus due to a torn rotator cuff and underwent a successful surgery. This ended her partnership with Lana.

Teaming with Nia Jax (2018–2019) 
On the October 15, 2018, episode of Raw, after nine months of inactivity due to various injuries, Tamina made a surprising return, working again as a heel. In her first match back, she teamed with Dana Brooke against Ember Moon and Nia Jax. During the match, it was announced that Tamina will be take part of the women's battle royal set for WWE Evolution. At the event, which took place on October 28, Tamina was one of the final competitors left but she was eliminated by Moon. Shortly after her return, Tamina started an alliance with Nia Jax, after multiple confrontations between the two. On the November 12 episode of Raw, Tamina achieved her first singles victory on Raw when she defeated Ember Moon. At Survivor Series, Tamina eliminated Naomi before she got eliminated by Carmella. On the November 19 episode of Raw, Tamina and Nia Jax scored a victory over Bayley and Sasha Banks and later on that night they confronted Ronda Rousey.

Tamina would participate in the Women's Royal Rumble match at the Royal Rumble on January 27, 2019, entering at number 10, eliminating Mickie James, before being eliminated by Charlotte Flair. Tamina and Jax would compete at the Elimination Chamber in an elimination chamber match for the WWE Women's Tag Team Championship, but were eliminated by Bayley, Sasha Banks, Sonya Deville, and Mandy Rose. On the final show of Raw before Fastlane, Tamina defeated Sasha Banks after a distraction from Jax. At Fastlane on March 10, Tamina and Jax unsuccessfully challenged Banks and Bayley for the WWE Women's Tag Team Championship. Afterwards, Tamina and Jax continued to attack Banks, Bayley, WWE Hall of Famer Beth Phoenix, who was performing commentary, and Natalya. On the March 25 episode of Raw, it was announced that Tamina and Jax would compete in a Fatal 4-Way match at WrestleMania 35 for the WWE Women's Tag Team Championship against current champions The Boss 'n' Hug Connection (Bayley and Banks), The IIconics (Billie Kay and Peyton Royce) and The Divas of Doom (Phoenix and Natalya). At the event on April 7, Tamina and Jax were unsuccessful when Kay pinned Bayley. Afterwards, Tamina and Jax would stop appearing on Raw after Jax underwent surgery for knee injuries.

After wrestling on Main Event several times and later suffering a concussion in July at a live event, Tamina returned at Hell in a Cell, defeating Carmella backstage for the 24/7 Championship, the first championship of her wrestling career. She later lost the championship to R-Truth later on in the night. As part of the 2019 draft, Tamina was drafted to SmackDown.

Teaming with Natalya (2020–2021) 
At the Royal Rumble event on January 26, 2020, Tamina competed in the women's Royal Rumble match, entering at number 14, lasting less than a minute before being eliminated by Bianca Belair. On the March 20 episode of SmackDown, Tamina was announced as a participant in a Fatal 5-Way elimination match for Bayley's SmackDown Women's Championship at WrestleMania 36. At WrestleMania 36, Tamina was the first woman eliminated after the four other competitors pinned her at once. Tamina demanded a title match against Bayley on the April 10 episode of SmackDown, which Bayley accepted if Tamina could defeat Sasha Banks the following week, which Tamina did, turning her face in the process. At the Money in the Bank event, Tamina failed to win the title. On the August 14 episode of SmackDown, Tamina competed in a triple brand battle royal to earn a WWE SmackDown Women's Championship match at SummerSlam, which was won by Asuka. On the October 12 episode of Raw, Tamina competed in another battle royal to earn a match for the Raw Women's Championship, which was won by Lana.

At the beginning of January 2021, Tamina turned heel once again, when formed an alliance with Natalya while "putting the women's tag team division on notice". At the Royal Rumble event on January 31, 2021, Tamina competed in the women's Royal Rumble match, but was eliminated by Nia Jax and Shayna Baszler. At WrestleMania 37 night 1, Tamina and Natalya won a tag team turmoil match to earn an opportunity at the WWE Women's Tag Team Championship, and the following night, they were unsuccessful. The two would continue feuding with Jax and Baszler, defeating them on the May 14 episode of SmackDown to win the WWE Women's Tag Team Championship, which they proceeded to lose to Rhea Ripley and Nikki Cross. At the Money in the Bank event, both women entered the Women's Money in the Bank ladder match, but would be unsuccessful in winning the briefcase as it was won by Nikki A.S.H.

As part of the 2021 Draft, Tamina was drafted to the Raw brand while Natalya remained on the SmackDown brand, ending the team.

Various feuds (2021–present)
On the January 3 episode of Raw, Tamina failed to win the WWE 24/7 Championship from Dana Brooke in a mixed tag team match also involving Reggie and Akira Tozawa. Tamina, Tozawa, and R-Truth then spent months trying unsuccessfully to win the title from Reggie and later Dana Brooke in various backstage segments. Tamina would however win the title on the April 18 edition of Raw, during a double wedding ceremony, losing it to her partner, Tozawa after. Later that month, due to him being unable to help her win the title, she filed for divorce.

After having an ongoing feud with Dana Brooke for the WWE 24/7 Championship, the 2 began to team together. On the August 5 episode of Smackdown, a tag team tournament to crown new champions was announced. Tamina and Brooke were announced as a team on the August 8 episode of Raw. Tamina and Dana Brooke lost in the first round against Iyo Sky and Dakota Kai. Due to an injury from Gigi Dolin after her and Jacy Jayne won round 1 against Natalya and Sonya Deville, it was announced on the August 22 episode of Raw that Tamina and Dana Brooke would be participating in a Second Chance Fatal Four Way to re-enter the Women's Tag Team Tournament on the August 26 episode of Smackdown, in which they lost.

Other media 
Snuka has appeared in seven WWE console games. She made her in-game debut in WWE 2K15 and appears in WWE 2K16 WWE 2K17, WWE 2K18, WWE 2K19, WWE 2K20 and WWE 2K22.

 Personal life 
Snuka is of Samoan and Fijian descent. She is the second daughter of the late WWE Hall of Famer Jimmy Snuka from his second wife, Sharon Snuka. Sarona has an older sister named Liana and younger maternal sister Ata. She is also the sister of former WWE wrestler, Deuce.  Snuka has two daughters.
On December 2, 2016, Snuka's father, Jimmy, was reported to be in hospice with  a terminal illness. He died  on January 15, 2017, in Pompano Beach, Florida at age 73.

 Filmography 

 Championships and accomplishments 
 Pro Wrestling Illustrated Ranked No. 19 of the top 50 female wrestlers in the PWI Female 50 in 2012
 Ranked No. 28 of the top 50 Tag Teams in the PWI Tag Team 50 in 2021 with Natalya
 Wrestling Observer Newsletter''
 Worst Feud of the Year (2015) Team PCB vs. Team B.A.D. vs. Team Bella
 Worst Worked Match of the Year (2013) with AJ Lee, Aksana, Alicia Fox, Kaitlyn, Rosa Mendes, and Summer Rae vs. Brie Bella, Cameron, Eva Marie, JoJo, Naomi, Natalya, and Nikki Bella on November 24
 WWE
 WWE Women's Tag Team Championship (1 time) – with Natalya
 WWE 24/7 Championship (9 times)

References

External links 

 
 
 
 

1978 births
American people of Samoan descent
American people of Fijian descent
American female professional wrestlers
American professional wrestlers of Samoan descent
Actresses of Samoan descent
Living people
Professional wrestlers from Washington (state)
Professional wrestling managers and valets
Sportspeople from Vancouver, Washington
WWE 24/7 Champions
21st-century American women
21st-century professional wrestlers